Andrews Chapel, also known as the McIntosh Log Church, is a historic Methodist church building in McIntosh, Alabama.  It is one of only a few remaining log churches in the state. It had its beginning in 1860 when John C. Rush and his wife donated land for the church to the Methodist McIntosh community. The church was built before the year ended.  It was named for James Osgood Andrew, a bishop in the Methodist Episcopal Church, South.

The squared-log building features square notched corners and a wood shingle roof.  A new church building was built in 1952 adjacent to the chapel.  The chapel was listed on the National Register of Historic Places on November 20, 1974.

References

External links

Churches on the National Register of Historic Places in Alabama
Methodist churches in Alabama
Churches completed in 1860
National Register of Historic Places in Washington County, Alabama
Buildings and structures in Washington County, Alabama
Southern Methodist churches in the United States
Historic American Buildings Survey in Alabama
Log buildings and structures on the National Register of Historic Places in Alabama
1860 establishments in Alabama